Elections were held in the Australian state of Victoria on Saturday 15 June 1946 to elect 17 of the 34 members of the state's Legislative Council for six year terms. MLCs were elected in single-member provinces using preferential voting.

Results

Legislative Council

|}

Retiring Members

Liberal
George Bolster MLC (Ballarat)

Country
Richard Kilpatrick MLC (Northern)

Candidates
Sitting members are shown in bold text. Successful candidates are highlighted in the relevant colour. Where there is possible confusion, an asterisk (*) is also used.

See also
1945 Victorian state election
1947 Victorian state election

References

1946 elections in Australia
Elections in Victoria (Australia)
1940s in Victoria (Australia)
June 1946 events in Australia